In functional analysis, a Banach function algebra on a compact Hausdorff space X is unital subalgebra, A, of the commutative C*-algebra  C(X) of all continuous, complex-valued functions from X, together with a norm on A that makes it a Banach algebra.

A function algebra is said to vanish at a point p if f(p) = 0 for all . A function algebra separates points if for each distinct pair of points , there is a function  such that .

Then 

Theorem: A Banach function algebra is semisimple (that is its Jacobson radical is equal to zero) and  each commutative unital, semisimple Banach algebra is isomorphic (via the Gelfand transform) to a Banach function algebra on its character space (the space of algebra homomorphisms from A into the complex numbers given the relative weak* topology).

a uniform algebra. Uniform algebras are an important special case of Banach function algebras.

References 

 Andrew Browder (1969) Introduction to Function Algebras, W. A. Benjamin
 H.G. Dales (2000) Banach Algebras and Automatic Continuity, London Mathematical Society Monographs 24, Clarendon Press 
 Graham Allan & H. Garth Dales (2011) Introduction to Banach Spaces and Algebras, Oxford University Press 

Banach algebras